The Martin 187 Baltimore was a twin-engined light attack bomber built by the Glenn L. Martin Company in the United States as the A-30. The model was originally ordered by the French in May 1940 as a follow-up to the earlier Martin Maryland, then in service in France. With the fall of France, the production series was diverted to Great Britain and after mid-1941, supplied by the U.S. as Lend Lease equipment.

Development of the Baltimore was hindered by a series of problems, although the type eventually became a versatile combat aircraft. Produced in large numbers, the Baltimore was not used operationally by United States armed forces but eventually served with the British, Canadian, Australian, South African, Hellenic and the Italian air forces. It was subsequently used almost exclusively in the Mediterranean and Middle East theatre of World War II.

Design and development
Initially designated the A-23 (derived from the A-22 Martin 167 Maryland design), the Model 187 (company designation) had a deeper fuselage and more powerful engines. The Model 187 met the needs for a light-to-medium bomber, originally ordered by the Anglo-French Purchasing Commission as a joint project in May 1940. The French Air Force sought to replace the earlier Maryland; 400 aircraft being ordered. With the Fall of France, the Royal Air Force (RAF) took over the order and gave it the service name Baltimore. To enable the aircraft to be supplied to the British under the Lend-Lease Act the United States Army Air Forces designation A-30 was allocated. With the passing of the Lend Lease Act two further batches of 575 and then 600 were provided to the RAF.

Operational history

The first British aircraft were delivered in late 1941 to equip Operational Training Units. The RAF only used the Baltimores operationally in the Mediterranean theater and North Africa. Many users were impressed by the step up that the Baltimore represented from older aircraft like the Bristol Blenheim. Users of the Baltimore and Martin pilot Benjamin R. Wallace, praised the aircraft for its heavy armament, structural strength, manoeuvrability, bombing accuracy and relatively high performance but crews complained of cramped conditions similar to those in the earlier Maryland bomber. The narrow fuselage made it nearly impossible for crew members to change positions during flight if wounded (the aircraft's interior structure separated the pilot and observer from the wireless operator and rear gunner, a characteristic shared with several light and medium bomber designs of that era e.g. Handley Page Hampden, Douglas Boston and Blenheim). Crews also complained about the difficulties in handling the aircraft on the ground. On takeoff, the pilot had to co-ordinate the throttles perfectly to avoid a nose-over or worse.

Thrown into action to stop Rommel's advance, the Baltimore suffered massive losses when it was used as a low-level attack aircraft, especially in the chaos of the desert war where most missions went unescorted. Operating at medium altitude with fighter escorts, the Baltimore had a very low loss rate, with the majority of losses coming from operational accidents. Undertaking a variety of missions in the Middle East, Mediterranean and European theaters, the Baltimore's roles included reconnaissance, target-towing, maritime patrol, night intruder and even served as highly uncomfortable fast transports. The Baltimore saw limited Fleet Air Arm service with aircraft transferred from the RAF in the Mediterranean to equip a squadron in 1944. Used in the anti-submarine role during the war, the Baltimore achieved moderate success, sinking up to eight U-boats.

The RAF also transferred aircraft to other Allies in the Mediterranean area. The Baltimore was used intensively in the Italian campaign to clear the road to Rome for advancing Allied forces after the capitulation of Italy in 1943. After the Armistice between Italy and Allied armed forces an Italian-manned squadron, the 28th Bomber Wing, was equipped with ex-RAF Baltimores, becoming the co-belligerent Stormo Baltimore. The Italians suffered considerable attrition during their training phase on the Baltimore. The majority of accidents were during takeoffs and landings due to the aircraft's fairly high wing loading, high approach speed and a directional stability problems during takeoffs. The Italians operated the Baltimore for about six months. Many of those operations were in Yugoslavia and Greece, providing air support for partisan forces or dropping supplies.

Most Baltimores were scrapped soon after the war, although one RAF squadron continued to use the type in Kenya where the aircraft were used in aerial mapping and locust control until 1948. In post-war service, the Baltimore took part in United States Navy instrument and control surface tests in the effort to break the sound barrier. With its powerful engines and light, yet robust construction, the aircraft was able to be dived at high speed, reaching Mach .74 in tests. All Baltimores were withdrawn from service by the end of 1949, the last one being retired on 23 December 1949.

Variants

Baltimore B. I
Fitted with 1,600 hp (1,193 kW) Wright GR-2600-A5B radial piston engines, armed with ten 0.303 in (7.7 mm) machine guns, eight fixed Brownings and two flexible Vickers K machine guns; all marks had two fixed 0.303 in (7.7 mm) Brownings in the leading-edge of each wing and four similar fixed guns, two on each side of the lower fuselage aft firing backwards, plus two flexible Vickers K guns in dorsal and ventral. 50 aircraft built.

Baltimore B. II
As with the Mk I; defensive armament was increased to twelve 0.303 in (7.7 mm) machine guns including twin 0.303 in (7.7 mm) Vickers K machine guns in both the dorsal and ventral positions. 100 aircraft built.

Baltimore B. III

Modified Mk II design defensive armament was increased to 14 0.303 in (7.7 mm) guns and improved with a hydraulically powered dorsal turret supplied by Boulton Paul in the UK with four Browning machine guns. 250 aircraft built.

Baltimore B. IIIa (A-30-MA)
Ordered by USAAF and supplied under Lend-lease to the RAF, two 0.50 in (12.7 mm) machine guns in a Martin-built electrically powered dorsal turret. 281 aircraft built.

Baltimore B. IV (A-30A-MA)
USAAF order, lend-lease to RAF. Four 0.303 in (7.7 mm) Brownings machine guns in the wings. 294 aircraft built.

Baltimore B. V (A-30A-MA)
USAAF order, Upgraded with two 1,700 hp (1,268 kW) Wright R-2600-29 radial piston engines, Wings fitted with 0.50 in (12.7 mm) machine guns. 600 aircraft built.

Baltimore GR. VI (A-30C-MA)
Two prototypes were built for maritime reconnaissance.  They included a lengthened fuselage, accommodations for extra fuel tanks and a torpedo, and a Radome in nose. The whole program was cancelled in April 1944.

All of the series were built for the RAF. A number were lost on delivery across the Atlantic Ocean when two ships carrying Baltimores were sunk.

Operators

 Royal Australian Air Force
 No. 454 Squadron RAAF (Baltimore III, IV, V) (North Africa, Pescara Italy: February 1943 – 14 August 1945)
 No. 459 Squadron RAAF  (Baltimore IV – V) (Mediterranean: July 1944 – March 1945)

 Royal Canadian Air Force
 Baltimore B. III FA187
 A single Baltimore was loaned to the RCAF by RAF Ferry Command for "special" project duties (1942)

 Free French Air Force
 GB 1/17

 Royal Hellenic Air Force
 RHAF 13 Light Bomber Squadron (Baltimore II, IV) (Gambut North Africa, Biferno Pescara Italy, Balkans: 1943–1945)

 Italian Co-Belligerent Air Force – 49 aircraft
 28° Gruppo (Stormo Baltimore) (1945 – February 1948)
 132° Gruppo – 254 Wing RAF

 Italian Air Force  operated 49 aircraft until 1947

 South African Air Force
 No. 15 Squadron SAAF  (Baltimore IIIa – V) (Mediterranean: 1943–1945)
 No. 21 Squadron SAAF. (Baltimore III – IV) (North Africa, Italy: 1942–1944)
 No. 60 Squadron SAAF (Baltimore II – III) (North Africa: 1942–1943)

 Turkish Air Force
 1st Bomber Regiment

 Royal Air Force
 1st Middle East Training Squadron
 No. 13 Squadron RAF (Baltimore IV – V)  (Italy: 1944)
 No. 52 Squadron RAF (Baltimore IIIa – V) (Tunisia, Italy: February 1942 – February 1943)
 No. 55 Squadron RAF (Baltimore I – V) (Libya, Tunisia, Italy: 1942–1944)
 No. 69 Squadron RAF (Baltimore I – IV) (Mediterranean: 1942–1944)
 No. 162 Squadron RAF (Baltimore III) (Libya: 1943–1944)
 No. 203 Squadron RAF (Baltimore I, II, IIIa, V) (North Africa: 1942–1943)
 No. 223 Squadron RAF (Baltimore I – V) (North Africa, Italy: April 1941 – 12 August 1944)
 No. 249 Squadron RAF (Baltimore IV – V) (South-East Europe: October 1945 – April 1946)
 No. 500 Squadron RAF (Baltimore IV – V) (Italy: 1944–1945)
 No. 680 Squadron RAF (Baltimore III, V) (Italy: 1944)
 Fleet Air Arm
 728 Naval Air Squadron (Baltimore GR IV – V) (Malta: September 1944 – October 1946)

Surviving aircraft
Although the Baltimore was produced in greater numbers than any other Martin design except the B-26 Marauder, with 1575 produced, no aircraft have survived intact, although the wreckage of several are known to exist.

Specifications (Baltimore GR.V)

See also

References
Notes

Bibliography

 Angelucci, Enzo and Paolo Matricardi. World Aircraft: World War II, Volume II (Sampson Low Guides). Maidenhead, UK: Sampson Low, 1978. .
 Bridgeman, Leonard. "The Martin Model 187 Baltimore." Jane's Fighting Aircraft of World War II. London: Studio, 1946. .
 Caliaro, Luigino. "51° Stormo: 'Ferruccio Serafini'." Wings of Fame, Volume 20. London: Aerospace Publishing Ltd., 2000. .
 Mermingas, Georgios. "Δημήτριος Π. Καγκελάρης, 'Ενας έφεδρος αρχισμηνίας πολυβολητής στην Ελληνική Βασιλική Αεροπορία"(in Greek). Military History magazine, No.144/2008, pp. 62–68.
 Shores, Christopher F. Martin Maryland and Baltimore variants (Aircraft in Profile, Volume 11) Windsor, Berkshire, UK: Profile Publications Ltd., 1972, pp. 217–241.
 
 Sturtivant, Ray and Mick Burrow. Fleet Air Arm Aircraft 1939 to 1945. Tonbridge, Kent, UK: Air Britain (Historians) Ltd, 1995. .

External links

 Aircraft: Martin XA-23 Baltimore
 The 13th "Hellenic Squadron"
 Demetre P. Canghelaris (1922–1996)
 Martin 187 RAF Squadrons
 RHAF Martin Baltimore FW 401 WW2 bomber found in Ikaria island, Greece

1930s United States attack aircraft
Baltimore
Mid-wing aircraft
Aircraft first flown in 1941
Twin piston-engined tractor aircraft